Peter O'Brian (born 1947) is a Canadian film producer and broadcast executive. Films produced by O'Brian's company, Independent Pictures, have won nineteen Genie Awards. His production credits include Blood and Guts, The Grey Fox, Outrageous!, John and the Missus, Milk and Honey and My American Cousin.

Born in Toronto, Ontario, O'Brian was educated at the University of Toronto and Emerson College in Boston, graduating in 1969 with a double major in mass communications and film. He returned to Toronto and began working as an assistant director and production manager.

In 1975, he produced his first film, the Dan Aykroyd movie Love at First Sight. In 1977, he founded Independent Pictures.

He took a sabbatical from producing in the early 1990s to run the Canadian Film Centre for its first three years of operation. In 1997, he became president of Mission Pictures.

On September 29, 2005, O'Brian was appointed chair of the board of TVOntario, the province of Ontario's public television network.

O'Brian is married to federal Minister for Mental Health & Addictions, and Associate Minister of Health, Dr. Carolyn Bennett.

References

External links
 Peter O'Brian profile at the Canadian Film Reference Library

Film producers from Ontario
University of Toronto alumni
Emerson College alumni
TVO executives
Spouses of Canadian politicians
1947 births
Living people
Academic staff of the Canadian Film Centre
People from Toronto